Allogaster geniculatus is a species of cerambycid of the tribe Achrysonini. They are mainly found in Africa, specifically The Democratic Republic of the Congo, Ivory Coast, Mali, Niger, and Senegal.

References 

Achrysonini